Earthphish is a music group formed in Switzerland in 2001, consisting of Aleksandra Mirjana Crossan, Donovan John Szypura and formerly André Ledergerber. Their debut album "Soft Green Exit" (CD) was released independently in 2003. Their song "Soulcandy" reached #1 on the electronic music charts on the online community GarageBand.com The music of Earthphish has been compared to trip hop artists such as Tricky, Massive Attack and Portishead.

History 
Keyboarder, composer and producer Donovan John Szypura played with Matthew Ashman (Adam & The Ants, Bow Wow Wow) in a Swiss punk rock band called "Rams". They worked together on the album "Wrecked" which was released in 1993. In 1999 Donovan John Szypura joined the industrial metal band Apollyon Sun formed by singer/guitarist Thomas Gabriel Fischer (Celtic Frost, Hellhammer, Triptykon) and guitarist Erol Unala. In early 2001 Donovan teamed up with drummer André Ledergerber and choreographer and singer Aleksandra Mirjana Crossan. The trio Earthphish released their demo CD "Metropolis" three months later.

The name Earthphish evolved from an early dance piece called "Earthphish & Ishram" choreographed by Aleksandra Mirjana Crossan. Earthphish converted to a creative production duo not limited to music. Aleksandra Mirjana Crossan and Donovan John Szypura became a symbiosis of music and dance and created several dance pieces performed by their contemporary dance company, Earthphish Dance.

Earthphish Dance received the Swiss Premio Furthering Prize for their dance piece in 2002
and won the second place for the same dance piece at the International Serge Diaghilev Competition of Choreography Art 2003 in Gdynia, Poland in 2003.

The Earthphish debut album "Soft Green Exit" (CD) was released independently in 2003.

Earthphish Dance premiered "Elephant Man" in Zurich, Switzerland in 2005. The dance piece was inspired by the movie 'The Elephant Man' directed by David Lynch, which is about the life of Joseph Carey Merrick.

In June 2006, Earthphish released their self-titled EP "Earthphish". 

Earthphish is now based in Tasmania, Australia. In March 2019 Earthphish announced on their Facebook page that they are working on a new album. In August 2020 they released their first single "Rite Of Life". The following singles "Raincoat" was released in September 2020 and ended up on Trip Hop Nation’s compilation "Best Release of the year 2020". The third single "Deadlock" was released in October 2020 and featured Dub music and Reggae legend Lee Scratch Perry. Their album "Turtles All The Way Down" was released on 21 December 2020 and has been selected in Trip Hop Nation’s list of "50 best albums of 2020". Earthphish further released two more singles, "Between the Bars", a cover version of artist Elliott Smith released in 2021, and "In the Hallway" released in 2022.

Style
Earthphish has not limited themselves to create music but also produced contemporary dance pieces. Their music is atmospheric, dark and bittersweet, surrealistic and often describing human struggles. Their music style has been described as electronic and trip hop. Their dance pieces have addressed social issues through abstract visual movement supported by original music compositions.

Earthphish acknowledge that they have been influenced by The Sandals, Tricky, Portishead, Eurythmics, and Killing Joke.

Discography

 "Metropolis" (Demo-CD) 2001
 "Soft Green Exit" (CD) 2003 
 "Earthphish" (EP) 2006
 "Rite Of Life" (Single) 2020
 "Raincoat" (Single) 2020
 "Deadlock feat. Lee Scratch Perry" (Single) 2020
 "Turtles All The Way Down" (Album) 2020
 "Between the Bars" (Single) 2021
 "In the Hallway" (Single) 2022

Band members

Current lineup 

 Aleksandra Mirjana Crossan – keyboards, vocals (2001–present)
 Donovan John Szypura – producing, keyboards, programming, vocals (2001–present)

Former members 
 André Ledergerber – drums (2001-2003)

Additional studio musicians 
 Merlin Szy – co-producing and programming on "Turtles All The Way Down" (Album) 2020
 Sandro Corbat – guitar on "Soft Green Exit" (CD) 2006 and "Turtles All The Way Down" (Album) 2020
 Dede Felix – co-producing and drums on "Soft Green Exit" (CD) 2003 and "Earthphish" (EP) 2006
 Luca Leombruni – bass guitar on "Soft Green Exit" (CD) 2003, "Earthphish" (EP) 2006, "Turtles All The Way Down" (Album) 2020
 Dominic Ruegg (Cuthead) – guitar on "Earthphish" (EP) 2006

Featuring musicians 
 Lee Scratch Perry – vocals on "Deadlock" - "Turtles All The Way Down" (Album) 2020
 Paris Burns – vocals on "Medusa" - "Turtles All The Way Down" (Album) 2020

Dance pieces 
 2005 – "Cut Down", 8° festival internacional de danca em paisagens urbanas, Coimbra, Portugal
 2005 – "Elephant Man", Theater Rigiblick, Zurich, Switzerland
 2003 – "Time Square", Fabriktheater, Zurich, Switzerland
 2003 – "Urgent Call", Tanzhaus Wasserwerk, Zurich, Switzerland
 2002 – "Beyond Henry", EWZ, Zurich, Switzerland
 2002 – "If I had a child", Premio furthering prize 2002, Zurich, Switzerland
 2001 – "Earthphish & Ishram", Petits Fours, Fabriktheater Zurich, Switzerland

Earthphish Dance members 
 Aleksandra Mirjana Crossan – choreography
 Sabine Schindler, Thomas Dietlicher, Jennifer Matheja, Audrey Borthayre, Zoltan Farago, Renata Schiess and Sybille Koch – dance
 Donovan John Szypura, Aleksandra Mirjana Crossan, Sandro Corbat – music
 Daniel Boller – stage design

Awards
 Swiss Premio Furthering Prize 2002 in Zurich, Switzerland - Earthphish Dance, "If I had a child"
 Second place at the ‘International Serge Diaghilev Competition of Choreography Art 2003 in Gdynia, Poland - Earthphish Dance, "If I had a child"

References

External links 
 Official Website

Swiss electronic music groups
Trip hop musicians
Musical groups established in 2001